Joey Matthew Browner (born May 15, 1960) is an American former professional football player who played as a safety in the National Football League (NFL) for the Minnesota Vikings from 1983 to 1991 and for the Tampa Bay Buccaneers in 1992.  Browner played college football for the USC Trojans.

High school career
Browner attended Western Reserve High in Warren, Ohio, for two years but moved for his junior and senior seasons to Atlanta, Georgia, where he attended Southwest High. He was an All State defensive lineman as a junior, played basketball with future NBA forward Gerald Wilkins, and ran track and field, qualifying twice for the Ohio State meet.

As a senior, Browner had 120 unassisted tackles and three interceptions earning Parade All-American Honors as well as the Georgia class 3-A lineman of the year. Browner was also named Atlanta Area Player of the Year. After high school it was generally believed that Browner would follow his three brothers to Notre Dame, but he instead decided on the University of Southern California.

College career
At USC, Browner was the team's Most Valuable Player in 1982. Other members of the Trojan defensive backfield included Dennis Smith, Hall of Famer Ronnie Lott, and future Los Angeles Rams head coach Jeff Fisher. Browner also played with Anthony Muñoz, Marcus Allen, Charles White, and Paul McDonald.  He was also selected to the first-team All-Pac-10, first-team All-Coast. Browner notched 243 total tackles, nine interceptions, 40 passes defended, seven fumble recoveries and three touchdown returns in his collegiate career.

His USC teams compiled a 36–8–1 mark. He played in one Rose Bowl Game and one Fiesta Bowl.

Professional career
Browner was the first round draft pick and 19th overall selection as safety of the Minnesota Vikings in 1983.

An outstanding defensive player and tackler, Browner was selected to six Pro Bowls (1985–1990) while playing with the Minnesota Vikings. He finished his career with the Tampa Bay Buccaneers in 1992. Browner was a four time member of the John Madden "All-Madden Team".

While with the Vikings, Browner travelled to China with the NFL players association in 1988, to Germany with the 1989 USO Tour, and to Paris to kick off the French Federation of American Football Annual Championship game in 1991.

Browner amassed over 1,100 total tackles, caused 18 fumbles and recovered 16 of them; he also led the Vikings in nine defensive categories over his NFL career.

Browner holds the NFL Pro Bowl record with three fumble recoveries returned for touchdowns. He had 40 interceptions in his career for 505 total yards including the playoffs.

The Minnesota Vikings placed Browner in the team's Ring of Honor in October 2013 on a Sunday night football game vs the Packers. Joey Browner was the 21st overall selection into the Minnesota Vikings Ring of Honor that night.

In 2019, the Professional Football Researchers Association named Browner to the PFRA Hall of Very Good Class of 2019

Personal

The Browner family has produced six NFL players: brothers the late  Ross Browner (Cincinnati Bengals & Green Bay Packers), Jim Browner (Cincinnati Bengals), and Keith Browner all played in the NFL, as do Ross's son Max Starks (Pittsburgh Steelers) and Keith's son, Keith Browner, Jr. (Houston Texans). Browner's next eldest brother Willard was drafted by the Chicago White Sox as a pitcher and also served as the starting tailback for Notre Dame with brother Ross's teams. Youngest and late brother Gerald played at the University of Georgia.

Browner is a member of the 1980s all star all decade team, of the NFL Gridiron Legends team along with former Viking teammate Cris Carter and the PAC 12 all century team, also on the EA Sports game, NFL Street 2. Joey Browner was enshrined into the African-American hall of fame in 2004 for his work in radio sports broadcasting with his longtime friend Rich Perez in Las Vegas and Hawaii.

Browner has been nominated for Pro Football Hall of Fame selection nine times.  He is the 21st member of the Ring of Honor and the 17th player in Minnesota Vikings history.  Browner was inducted into the All "Mall of America Field" team signifying the best players who played for the Vikings during their years at the Metrodome/Mall of America Field.

References

External links
 

1960 births
Living people
American football safeties
Minnesota Vikings players
USC Trojans football players
Tampa Bay Buccaneers players
National Conference Pro Bowl players
Sportspeople from Warren, Ohio
Players of American football from Atlanta
Players of American football from Ohio
African-American players of American football
21st-century African-American people
20th-century African-American sportspeople